Christopher Alan Saunders (born 15 January 1950) is an Australian prelate of the Catholic Church who served as the bishop of Broome from 1996 to 2021, when he resigned amid allegations of sexual misconduct. However he was not charged with any police charges due to lack of evidence.

Biography
Christopher Saunders was born on 15 January 1950. He studied at St. Bede’s College in Mentone, Victoria, and then studied philosophy for three years with the Columbians. Having developed an interest in aboriginal affairs, he was accepted by the Diocese of Broome and continued his studies in theology at St Francis Xavier Seminary in Adelaide. He worked as a deacon in Broome in 1975 and was ordained a priest of that diocese on 28 August 1976. His assignments took him to La Grange Mission (1976–1978), Lombadina Mission (1978–1982), and Kalumburu Mission (1982–1988). From 1989 to 1995 he was administrator of Broome, interrupted by two years of study for a licentiate in canon law at St. Paul's Pontifical University in Ottawa, Canada.

Saunders was named bishop of the Broome, Australia, on 3 November 1995, and consecrated a bishop on 8 February 1996.

On 9 March 2020, Saunders voluntarily stood aside from the administration of the diocese after the Vatican ordered a review of the diocese. Church authorities did not indicate any connection between that investigation and the news that Western Australian Police had been investigating an allegation made of sexual misconduct made against him 18 months earlier. Peter Ingham, Bishop emeritus of Wollongong, has been tasked with the Church's investigation into Saunder's management, including financial affairs and handling allegations of sexual misconduct by priests. The Church had received complaints about Saunders as early as April 2019 and tried to evaluate them while preventing their repetition and without alerting Saunders. On 27 November 2020, Saunders agreed to take a six-months leave "outside the Diocese", where his continued performance in public as a priest has provoked complaints.

In May 2021, government officials decided not to file criminal charges. Pope Francis accepted his resignation as Bishop of Broome on 28 August 2021.

References

External links

1950 births
Living people
Religious leaders from Melbourne
21st-century Roman Catholic bishops in Australia
20th-century Roman Catholic bishops in Australia
Roman Catholic bishops of Broome